Thomas Homewood (25 September 18811 February 1945) was a British tug of war competitor who competed in the 1908 Summer Olympics. In 1908 he won the bronze medal as member of the British team Metropolitan Police "K" Division.

He was killed during World War II in February 1945, aged 63, when his home in Stratford, London was struck by a V2 rocket.

References

External links
Thomas Homewood's profile at databaseOlympics
Thomas Homewood's profile at Sports Reference.com

1881 births
1945 deaths
Metropolitan Police officers
Olympic tug of war competitors of Great Britain
Tug of war competitors at the 1908 Summer Olympics
Olympic bronze medallists for Great Britain
Olympic medalists in tug of war
Medalists at the 1908 Summer Olympics
British civilians killed in World War II
Deaths by airstrike during World War II
20th-century British people